Dagmar Rehak (born 16 January 1956) is a retired German breaststroke swimmer who won a bronze medal at the 1977 European Aquatics Championships. She competed at the 1976 Summer Olympics in the 100 m and 200 m breaststroke and 4 × 100 m medley relay events but did not reach the finals. During her career she won six national titles in the 100 m (1974, 1977, 1980) and 200 m (1974, 1975, 1978) breaststroke. She missed the 1980 Summer Olympics because of their boycott by West Germany.

References

1956 births
Living people
German female swimmers
Swimmers at the 1976 Summer Olympics
German female breaststroke swimmers
Olympic swimmers of West Germany
European Aquatics Championships medalists in swimming